De Spooktrein  is a 1939 Dutch film directed by Carl Lamac.

It is an adaptation of the popular British play The Ghost Train by Arnold Ridley.

Cast
 Jan Musch	as Barendse
  as Julia van Dongen
 Louis Borel as Ted
 Adolphe Engers as Professor Alberto
 Cissy Van Bennekom as Corrie
 Sara Heyblom as Juffrouw Borneman
 Chris Baay as Eddy van Nie
 Lies de Wind as Mieke
 Lau Ezerman as Treinconducteur
 Nico De Jong as Dr. Looman
 John Gobau	
 Piet Rienks as Bendeleider
 Hans Tiemeyer as Inspecteur Bloemhof

External links 
 

1939 films
Dutch black-and-white films
Dutch films based on plays
Rail transport films
Dutch remakes of British films
Dutch horror films
1939 horror films
1930s Dutch-language films